Anolis forresti is a species of lizard in the family Dactyloidae. The species is found in Barbuda.

References

Anoles
Endemic fauna of Barbuda
Reptiles described in 1923
Taxa named by Thomas Barbour